Staël is a surname. Notable people with the surname include:

 Anne Louise Germaine de Staël (“Madame de Staël”) (1766–1817), French woman of letters and political theorist
 Nicolas de Staël (1914–1955), French painter of Russian origin
 Staël von Holstein, Baltic German baronial family